Corybantes pylades is a moth in the Castniidae family. It is found in Suriname, Brazil (Amazonas) and French Guiana.

The wingspan is 160–180 mm. Adults have been recorded in October, March and December.

References

Moths described in 1782
Castniidae